Kelley Eckels Currie is an American human rights lawyer and former government official who served as the Ambassador-at-Large for Global Women's Issues from 2020 to 2021. She previously served as the U.S. Representative to the United Nations Economic and Social Council and as the Acting Deputy Representative of the U.S. to the U.N., after Michele Sison's departure. Before assuming her role as Ambassador-at-Large for Global Women's Issues, she was a senior fellow at the Project 2049 Institute, a think tank focused on security issues and public policy in Central Asia and the Asia-Pacific region. She previously held senior public policy positions with the United States Department of State and several international and nongovernmental human rights and humanitarian organizations. Currie also served as foreign operations appropriations associate and staff director of the Congressional Human Rights Caucus for Representative John Porter.

In March 2019, it was announced that President Donald Trump would nominate Currie as the United States Ambassador-at-Large for Global Women's Issues and representative of the United States on the United Nations Commission on the Status of Women. This nomination was submitted in June 2019 and approved by voice vote of the U.S. Senate on December 19, 2019. She joined the office in January 2020.

References

External links
 Biography at Project 2049 Institute

Living people
University of Georgia alumni
Georgetown University Law Center alumni
Trump administration personnel
Year of birth missing (living people)
American women ambassadors
Ambassadors of the United States
21st-century American women
American women diplomats